Weltzien is a surname. Notable people with the surname include:

Audun Weltzien (born 1983), Norwegian orienteering competitor
Eystein Weltzien (born 1949), Norwegian orienteering competitor
Ingunn Hultgreen Weltzien (born 1986), Norwegian orienteering competitor and cross-country skier
Karl Weltzien (1813–1870), German scientist 
Ludwig von Weltzien (1815-1870), Prussian lieutenant general